Uruz may refer to:

 the reconstructed Proto-Germanic name of the Elder Futhark u rune  (*Ūruz with the meaning ″aurochs, wild ox″), see Ur (rune),
 a European project to breed back the extinct aurochs, see Uruz Project.